"Strawberries & Cigarettes" is a song by Australian singer-songwriter Troye Sivan, released on 16 March 2018 as the third and final single from the Love, Simon soundtrack. The song was originally written for Sivan's debut album, Blue Neighborhood.

At the 23rd Satellite Awards, the song was nominated for Satellite Award for Best Original Song.

Critical reception
Fuse TV called the song "an immediate standout from the soundtrack that will remind you of the first time you ever fell in love" adding "From the romantic lyricism to the lush production, 'Strawberries & Cigarettes' is a beautifully heartbreaking tale of a fairytale-like love that is no longer." Sam Samshenas from Gay Times UK called it a "nostalgic pop number" and "one of Troye's best songs to date". All Things Go said "This is one of those perfect pop songs that go out to that special someone we love. Though heavily layered with studio magic, Troye's vocals stand out the most, serenading with the warmth of true love."

Charts

References

2018 singles
2018 songs
Troye Sivan songs
Songs written by Jack Antonoff
Songs written by Troye Sivan
Songs written by Alex Hope (songwriter)